The Institute Library (Originally established as the New Haven Young Men's Institute, and sometimes called the Young Men's Institute Library) is a membership library in New Haven, Connecticut. Founded in 1826 in the tradition of Mechanics' Institutes, it is New Haven's oldest community library and one of the few membership libraries now remaining in North America.  The organization was  active during the 19th century as a center for lectures, debates, and classes in New Haven.

History

The Institute Library was born out of the Apprentices' Literary Association.  Founded in August 1826, this association organized as an educational society and declared as it mission the "mutual assistance in the attainment of useful knowledge." It promoted this mission through a collection of books amassed by the initial group of eight members and the scheduling of regular meetings of the membership.

The Association drew the interest of local educators.  Shortly afterwards, classes, alongside readings and debates, were regularly featured. In 1835, the Association permitted women to join. In 1841, the organization renamed itself as The New Haven Young Men's Institute. A center of adult education, literary discussion, and civil discourse throughout much of the 19th century, it stood as the largest circulating library in the city and the site of popular lecture series. Speakers at the Institute included  Henry Ward Beecher, Ralph Waldo Emerson, Frederick Douglass, and Anna E. Dickinson.  In 1878, the Institute Library, as it came to be called by its membership, relocated to its current location at 847 Chapel Street in New Haven, Connecticut.

In 1887, the New Haven Free Public Library was established, transforming the Institute Library's focus and mission. Librarian William A. Borden in the years that followed took the opportunity to experiment with new library technologies and practices with collections housed at the Institute Library.  Borden formulated a new classification system for the library's collection.

Present day

After a long period of decline in membership and activity, the library began a period of reengagement with the New Haven community in 2011 and now hosts and sponsors various programs in the arts and humanities. In February of that year, the library hired its first executive director and embarked on a series of major repairs and renovations to the historical building in which the library is housed. In 2011, the Institute Library received the Arts Award from the Arts Council of Greater New Haven for its revitalization efforts.

References

External links
 Official website

1826 establishments in Connecticut
Buildings and structures in New Haven, Connecticut
Subscription libraries in the United States
Libraries in New Haven County, Connecticut
Charities based in Connecticut